C27 or C-27 may refer to:

Vehicles 
 Aeritalia C-27A Spartan,  an Italian military transport aircraft
 Alenia C-27J Spartan, an Italian military transport aircraft
 Bellanca C-27 Airbus, a military transport aircraft used by the United States Army Air Corps
 Caspar C 27, a German seaplane trainer
 Caudron C.27, a French biplane
 , a C-class submarine of the Royal Navy

Other uses 
 C27 road (Namibia)
 Bill C-27 (39th Canadian Parliament, 2nd Session)
 Caldwell 27, an emission nebula 
 Caterpillar C27, a diesel engine